Connecticut's 102nd House of Representatives district elects one member of the Connecticut House of Representatives. It encompasses parts of Branford and has been represented by Democrat Robin Comey since 2019.

Recent elections

2020

2018

2016

2014

2012

References

102